Belosavci   is a village in the municipality of Topola, Serbia. According to the 2002 census, the village has a population of 1182 people.

References

Populated places in Šumadija District